Delta Coronae Australis is a single star located in the southern constellation of Corona Australis. It is visible to the naked eye as a faint, orange-hued star with an apparent visual magnitude of 4.57. The star is located about 174 light years from the Sun based on parallax, and is drifting further away with a radial velocity of +21 km/s.

This object is an evolved giant star with a stellar classification of K1III. After exhausting the supply of hydrogen at its core, the star expanded off the main sequence and now has 11 times the radius of the Sun. It is a red clump giant, which indicates it is on the horizontal branch and is generating energy through core helium fusion. The star is 2.8 billion years old with 1.5 times the mass of the Sun. It is radiating 55 times the Sun's luminosity from its enlarged photosphere at an effective temperature of 4,654 K.

References

K-type giants
Horizontal-branch stars

Corona Australis
Corona Australis, Delta
Durchmusterung objects
177873
094005
7242